A Fresnel lantern (pronounced frəˈnɛl or fruh-nel) is a common lantern used in theatre that employs a Fresnel lens to wash light over an area of the stage. The lens produces a wider, soft-edged beam of light, which is commonly used for back light and top light.

The distinctive lens has a 'stepped' appearance instead of the 'full' or 'smooth' appearance of other lenses. This allows the lens to have a much greater curvature than would otherwise be practical. The lens focuses the light by tilting each ring of glass slightly more toward the center as the distance is increased from the center of the lens. If the glass were completely flat, this would cause a corresponding pattern of circles of light, so Fresnel lenses are usually stippled on the flat side. This pattern of small bumps helps to break up the light passing through the lens and gives Fresnels their characteristic soft beam. This means that the intensity of the light is consistent across the spread of the beam of light, as opposed to being less intense around the edges as in an ERS. The stepped lens design causes less heat buildup than does a plano-convex lens of the same angle.

These lenses are named after their inventor, Augustin-Jean Fresnel, who developed the lens initially for use in lighthouses.

Construction
Theatrical Fresnels are typically made in eight-, six- or three-inch varieties, referring to the diameter of the lens, with lamps ranging in power from 150 W (typically with a three-inch lens) to 2,000 W (eight-inch lens). The three-inch variety is referred to as an inkie. Fresnel lenses can operate close to the light source and are very cheap to produce, so the lanterns tend to be small and cheap.

In film lighting, a much greater range of lens and lamp sizes are produced and used. For commonly available fixtures, lenses range in size from 2 to 24 inches, and lamp power ranges between 150 W and 24,000 W.

Fresnels use a spherical reflector, with the filament of the lamp at the focus point of the reflector. The reflector effectively doubles the light output of the fixture, as all light that is emitted backwards into the reflector is reflected back through the filament of the lamp and out the front. As with most lighting fixtures, the lamp and reflector cannot move independently, and remain a fixed unit inside the housing. It is this unit that is moved back and forth inside the lamp to focus the light. This is done by a slider on the bottom of the lantern, or by a worm track with a crank in the back of the unit. The lamps are almost always mounted 'base down', i.e. with the bulb standing upwards. Burning these lamps upside down will shorten lamp life significantly.

Fresnels are not very efficient. The reflector cannot be larger than the lens aperture, and thus all the radiated light that is neither redirected forward by the spherical reflector behind the bulb nor emitted directly through the lens is absorbed by the casing as waste heat.

The degree to which the lamp may be focused is limited by the length of the housing. To reduce the width of the beam, the lamp and reflector are moved further back from the lens (spot focus). However, the farther back in the housing the lamp is placed, the more light is wasted in the housing.

Use

In the theater and dance world, Fresnels are most often used for top or backlighting, at medium throw distances. In small venues, they are occasionally used for front light, although the relative lack of control, when compared to an ellipsoidal, is a major disadvantage. The distinctive soft beam of a fresnel can make it very useful as a special in certain situations.
 
While the focus can alter the size of the beam, the distinctive scatter of light that the Fresnel lens emits also requires a way of controlling its shape. Since Fresnels cannot use internal shutters, such as those found in an ellipsoidal spotlight, they are often fitted with distinctive barn doors to control the spill and shape the beam of light. These are large metal flaps that may be mounted just beyond the color slot at the front of the lantern. They are colloquially known as "Harris Flaps" in the United Kingdom theatre industry.

References 

Stage lighting instruments